The Voisin XII was a prototype French two-seat four-engine biplane bomber built near the end of the First World War but which did not enter service.

Development
The Voisin XII was a long-range night bomber with four Hispano-Suiza 8Bc engines mounted in pairs in tandem. The aircraft was built in response to the BN2 requirement for a long-range night bomber. One prototype was built and test flights were successful, but the war's end precluded the Voisin XII from being ordered into production.

The Voison XIII night-bomber or Type E.87-2 was a proposed development of the Voisin XII, it was not built.

Specifications (Voisin XII Bn.2)

See also

References

Citations

Bibliography

12
1910s French bomber aircraft
Biplanes
Military aircraft of World War I
Aircraft first flown in 1918